Tetanocera is a genus of marsh flies, insects in the family Sciomyzidae. There are at least 50 described species in Tetanocera.

Species
T. amurensis Hendel, 1909
T. andromastos Steyskal, 1963
T. annae Steyskal, 1938
T. apicalis (Bigot, 1858)
T. arnaudi Orth and Fisher, 1982
T. arrogans Meigen, 1830
T. bergi Steyskal, 1954
T. brevisetosa Frey, 1924
T. chosenica Steyskal, 1951
T. clara Loew, 1862
T. claripennis (Robineau-Desvoidy, 1830)
T. cornuta Walker, 1853
T. discendens Becker, 1907
T. elata (Fabricius, 1781)
T. ferriginea Fallén, 1820
T. ferruginea Fallén, 1820
T. freyi Stackelberg, 1963
T. fuscinervis (Zetterstedt, 1838)
T. gracilior Stackelberg, 1963
T. hyalipennis Roser, 1840
T. ignota Becker, 1907
T. iowensis Steyskal, 1938
T. kerteszi Hendel, 1901
T. lacera Wiedemann, 1830
T. lapponica Frey, 1924
T. latifibula Frey, 1924
T. loewi Steyskal, 1959
T. marginella (Robineau-Desvoidy, 1830)
T. maritima (Robineau-Desvoidy, 1830)
T. melanostigma Steyskal, 1959
T. mesopora Steyskal, 1959
T. montana Day, 1881
T. nigricosta Rondani, 1868
T. nigrostriata Li, Yang & Gu, 2001
T. obtusifibula Melander, 1920
T. ornatifrons Frey, 1924
T. oxia Steyskal, 1959
T. phyllophora Melander, 1920
T. plebeja Loew, 1862
T. plumosa Loew, 1847
T. punctifrons Rondani, 1868
T. robusta Loew, 1847
T. rotundicornis Loew, 1861
T. silvatica Meigen, 1830
T. soror Melander, 1920
T. spirifera Melander, 1920
T. spreta Wulp, 1897
T. stricklandi Steyskal, 1959
T. valida Loew, 1862
T. vicina Macquart, 1843

References

Further reading

External links

 

Sciomyzidae
Sciomyzoidea genera
Taxa named by André Marie Constant Duméril